The Famous four universities in republican China were four universities that moved inland to avoid the war damages while still managing to keep the schools running during Second Sino-Japanese War, namely the National Central University, the Wuhan University, the Zhejiang University, and the National Southwestern Associated University. After the war, University of Oxford acknowledged their effort and excellence by granting their students the status of seniors when they meet certain standards.

References

See also
Higher education in China
History of education in China

Higher education in China
History of education in China